Maharakshak: Aryan is an Indian television show that premiered on 1 November 2014 on Zee TV. Aryan is the first amongst Zee TV's superhero trilogy 'Maharakshak' that will showcase the triumph of good over evil. Its sequel, Maharakshak: Devi, debuted 14 March 2015 on Zee TV.

Plot summary
Maharakshak Aryan is a story of a college student Aryan. He has no clue about his supernatural powers until the day he turns 18.

Cast
 Aakarshan Singh as Aryan Sharma
 Vikramjeet Virk as Triloki
 Reena Aggarwal as Miyaki
 Khalid Siddiqui as Arjun Sharma
 Abigail Jain as Manasvi
 Rishabh Jain as Ishaan "Pissu" Sharma
 Parinita Seth as Amrita Sharma
 Shabnam Pandey as Riya
 Reshmi Ghosh as Vishkanya / Vishakha
 Mishal Raheja as Chhala
 Parag Tyagi as Lohaputra
 Aparna Kumar as Murtika
 Meghna Naidu as Swarnakha
 Paras Arora as Aseem
 Dimple Jhangiani as Yuvika
 Rucha Gujarathi as Yuvika
 Rajesh Khera as Senapati Karakasur
 Vishal Jethwa as Veer (Banasur)
 Thakur Anoop Singh as Kaal

Game
Zee TV launched a mobile version game of this TV series, developed by Bigtrunk Communications.

Successor
Another series named Maharakshak: Devi debuted 14 March 2015 on Zee TV. It was the second installment of the Maharakshak trilogy.

References

Zee TV original programming
Hindi-language television shows
2014 Indian television series debuts
Indian superhero television shows
Child superheroes
Science fantasy television series
Television series about shapeshifting
Indian fantasy television series